Ingleby Arncliffe is a village and civil parish in the Hambleton district of North Yorkshire, England. The village is conjoined to its smaller neighbour, Ingleby Cross. Ingleby Arncliffe lies in the historic county of the North Riding of Yorkshire.

History

According to A Dictionary of British Place Names, Ingleby is derived from the Old Scandinavian "Englar + by", meaning "farmstead or village of the Englishmen", and Arncliffe, Old English "earn + cliff", meaning "eagles' cliff".

Ingleby Arncliffe Grade II* listed Anglican church is dedicated to All Saints. It dates from 1821 but includes 14th-century effigies.

At the centre of the village is a Grade II listed water tower, built in 1915 to supply water to the village.

Notable people
 Rev. David Simpson, Anglican priest was born here in 1745

References

External links

Villages in North Yorkshire
Civil parishes in North Yorkshire